Alibis and Ammunition is the only album by the punk rock band Trashlight Vision. It was released on November 14, 2006 through the independent record label Evo Recordings.

Track listing
 "Dead Waves on the Air" - 3:20
 "Allergic to You" - 3:53
 "I Can't Wait (To Do Nothing)" - 2:58
 "Screw Worm Baby" - 3:24
 "Faceplant Pavement" - 3:23
 "My Brain Is Hanging Upside Down (Bonzo Goes to Bitburg)" - 3:57
 "NOLA" - 2:54
 "My F**k You 2 U" - 3:41
 "Black Apples" - 2:50
 "New Junk" - 1:30
 "Horns and Halos" - 3:30
 "Sick One" - 3:14

External links
 https://web.archive.org/web/20061015033307/http://www.pressbox.co.uk/detailed/Entertainment/EVO_Recording_Artists_Trashlight_Vision_Set_To_Release_Alibis_and_Ammunition_In_November_84498.html

2006 albums
Trashlight Vision albums